Greatest Hits is a compilation album by Kathy Troccoli, released on July 1, 2003, by Reunion Records. The album peaked at No. 39 on Billboards Top Christian Albums chart on July 25, 2003.

Critical reception

Aaron Latham of AllMusic writes, "this is a fine collection that should please fans as well as newcomers who are discovering the gifts of song and inspiration offered by Troccoli."

Track listing

Track information and credits adapted from the album's liner notes.

Credits and personnel 
Credits adapted from Tidal.

Musicians

 Kathy Troccoli – lead vocals
 David Cleveland – acoustic guitar (1, 5)
 Gordon Kennedy – electric guitar (1)
 Michael Mellett – vocal arrangement (1), background vocals (1, 5)
 Fiona Mellett – background vocals (1)
 Leanne Albrecht – background vocals (1)
 Nirva Dorsaint – background vocals (1)
 LeAnne Palmore – background vocals (1)
 Jerard Woods – background vocals (1)
 Jovaun Woods – background vocals (1)

Production

 Michael Omartian – producer (10, 14)
 Ric Wake – producer (7, 8)
 Tony McAnany – producer (12)
 Christopher Harris – producer (4)
 Nathan DiGesare – producer (6, 9)
 Rick Chudacoff – producer (2, 3, 11, 13)
 Peter Bunetta – producer (2, 3, 11, 13)
 Brown Bannister – producer (1, 5)
 Matt Baugher – executive producer
 Jason McArthur – A&R
 Lauri Melick – A&R production
 Michelle Bentrem – assistant (5)
 Steve Bishir – engineer, mixing (5)
 Traci Sterling Bishir – production coordination (5)
 Stephanie McBrayer – art direction
 Hank Nirider – assistant, digital editing (5)
 Blair Masters – programming
 Bernie Herms – programming (5)
 Russ Harrington – photography
 Rusty Mitchell – graphic design

Charts

References 

2003 greatest hits albums
Kathy Troccoli albums
Reunion Records albums